France competed at the 1994 Winter Olympics in Lillehammer, Norway.

Medalists

Competitors
The following is the list of number of competitors in the Games.

Alpine skiing

Men

Women

Biathlon

Men

Women

Bobsleigh

Cross-country skiing

Men

Women

Figure skating

Men

Women

Ice Dancing

Freestyle skiing

Men

Women

Ice hockey

Men's team competition

Team roster
Michel Valliere
Petri Ylönen
Stéphane Botteri
Gérald Guennelon
Christophe Moyon
Denis Perez
Serge Poudrier
Bruno Saunier
Steven Woodburn
Benjamin Agnel
Stéphane Arcangeloni
Stéphane Barin
Arnaud Briand
Sylvain Girard
Benoît Laporte
Eric LeMarque
Pierrick Maia
Franck Pajonkowski
Pierre Pousse
Antoine Richer
Franck Saunier
Christophe Ville
Head coach: Kjell Larsson

Results

Nordic combined

Short track speed skating

Men

Women

Ski jumping

References

Official Olympic Reports
International Olympic Committee results database

Nations at the 1994 Winter Olympics
1994
Winter Olympics